Hisham Al-Obaidi (born 20 March 1988) is a Saudi Arabian handball player for Al-Wehda and the Saudi Arabian national team.

References

1988 births
Living people
Saudi Arabian male handball players
Handball players at the 2014 Asian Games
Handball players at the 2018 Asian Games
Asian Games competitors for Saudi Arabia
20th-century Saudi Arabian people
21st-century Saudi Arabian people